Ewhurst is a village in Hampshire, England, and  northwest of Basingstoke. Its parish church dates from 1682. The village itself is much older, being referenced as "Ywyrstæ stigel" in 1023, appearing in the Domesday Book as "Werste", and later as "Ywhurst" in 1242.

Governance
The village is part of the civil parish of Baughurst and is part of the Baughurst and Tadley North ward of Basingstoke and Deane borough council. The borough council is a Non-metropolitan district of Hampshire County Council.

References

External links

Villages in Hampshire